Boletus hortonii is a fungus of the genus Boletus native to the United States. First described as variety corrugis of Boletus subglabripes by Charles Horton Peck in 1897, it was given its current name in 1971 by mycologists Alexander H. Smith and Harry Delbert Thiers. The species is edible.

See also
List of Boletus species
List of North American boletes

References

External links
 

hortonii
Edible fungi
Fungi described in 1971
Fungi of the United States
Taxa named by Alexander H. Smith
Fungi without expected TNC conservation status